Dębno may refer to the following places in Poland:
Dębno, a town in West Pomeranian Voivodeship (NW Poland)
Dębno, Trzebnica County in Lower Silesian Voivodeship (south-west Poland)
Dębno, Wołów County in Lower Silesian Voivodeship (south-west Poland)
Dębno, Kuyavian-Pomeranian Voivodeship (north-central Poland)
Dębno, Brzesko County in Lesser Poland Voivodeship (south Poland)
Dębno, Nowy Targ County in Lesser Poland Voivodeship (south Poland)
Dębno, Gmina Nowa Słupia in Świętokrzyskie Voivodeship (south-central Poland)
Dębno, Gmina Raków in Świętokrzyskie Voivodeship (south-central Poland)
Dębno, Subcarpathian Voivodeship (south-east Poland)
Dębno, Opatów County in Świętokrzyskie Voivodeship (south-central Poland)
Dębno, Piła County in Greater Poland Voivodeship (west-central Poland)
Dębno, Poznań County in Greater Poland Voivodeship (west-central Poland)
Dębno, Środa Wielkopolska County in Greater Poland Voivodeship (west-central Poland)
Dębno, Pomeranian Voivodeship (north Poland)